The 1949 Indiana Hoosiers football team represented the Indiana Hoosiers in the 1949 Big Nine Conference football season. They participated as members of the Big Ten Conference. The Hoosiers played their home games at Memorial Stadium in Bloomington, Indiana. The team was coached by Clyde B. Smith, in his second year as head coach of the Hoosiers.

Schedule

1950 NFL Draft

References

Indiana
Indiana Hoosiers football seasons
Indiana Hoosiers football